Hưng Yên is a province in the Red River Delta of northern Vietnam. The province is a settlement along the banks of the Red River, bordered by 5 provinces and municipalities (Bắc Ninh province, Hải Dương province, Hà Nội, Thái Bình province, Hà Nam province).

History

Feudal dynasties
The area of the province of Hưng Yên has been inhabited for millennia.

During the legendary Hưng Kings period, Hưng Yên belonged to Giao Chỉ, in Du Chien district. Under the Ngô dynasty, it was called Dang Chau. It was then renamed Thái Bình phủ (phủ is an administrative unit) under the Early Lê dynasty, Dang Chau and Khoái Châu phủ under the Lý dynasty and Long Hung lo (lo is an administrative unit) and Khoái lo under the Trần Dynasty. Under the Later Lê dynasty, Hưng Yên belonged to Sơn Nam and then divided into Sơn Nam Thượng lo and Sơn Nam Hạ lo.

The Nguyễn dynasty implemented administrative reforms in 1831 to dismantle the trấn administrative units and establish provinces. Five districts of Đông Yên, Kim Động, Thiên Thi, Phù Cừ and Tiên Lữ were separated from Khoái Châu phủ of Sơn Nam Thượng trấn and three districts of Thần Khê, Hưng Nhân and Duyên Hà were separated from Tiên Hưng phủ of Nam Định trấn of lower Sơn Nam town to establish Hưng Yên Province. The initial centre of the province was located in An Vu and Luong Dien communes and then moved to Nhi Tan of Xích Đằng commune (now Hưng Yên city).

This area has favourable transport conditions with communes and markets lying side by side, enabling trading activities to be busier and busier. The Chronicle of Hưng Yên Province stated: "The streets are very busy and bustle, crowded with vehicles; the old images of Phổ Hiền in Sơn Nam can be seen now in this land".

French colonization
The name Hưng Yên officially appeared in the directory of the country in 1831. For that reason, prior to the French occupation of Vietnam, Hưng Yên was a province located on both sides of the Luộc River. Since its establishment, the province's territory has changed many times.

On March 27, 1833, French troops led by Captain Henri Rivière moved along the Red River from Hanoi and defeated Nam Định citadel. He then demanded Sub lieutenant Edgard de Trentinian to lead a unit of troops to attack Hưng Yên citadel. After occupying Hưng Yên, they made many efforts to strengthen their puppet government and establish various troop stations on one hand, while speeding up the measuring and mapping work for deep involvement into communes and hamlets. However, they met many difficulties, confronting resistance by the Bãi Sậy uprising.

In 1890, the French set up the Bãi Sậy area consisting of Yên Mỹ, Yen Hao, Văn Lâm and Cam Luong districts for the purpose of easier suppression of revolts. After the failure of the Bãi Sậy rebellion, they merged Van Lam, Yên Mỹ and Yen Hao districts into Hưng Yên province and returned Cam Luong district (now Cẩm Giàng) to Hải Dương province.

Also in 1890, the French split Thần Khê district from Tiên Hưng phủ of Hưng Yên province and Thái Bình phủ and Kiến Xương phủ from Nam Định province and set up a new province called Thái Bình. Afterwards, they went on to cut Hưng Nhân and Duyen Ha districts and transferred Tiên Lữ district (formerly belonging to Tiên Hưng) to merge into Khoái Châu phủ. Ever since, the Luộc River has served as the natural border between Hưng Yên and Thái Bình. This period lasted from French colonization to the August Revolution in 1945.

Modern Vietnam
When the anti-French resistance war was won and peace was restored in the north, district-level administrative units remained unchanged, except the changes in the administrative names of some wards and communes.

On January 26, 1968, the Standing Committee of the National Assembly approved a resolution on the unification of Hải Dương and Hưng Yên into Hải Hưng province. After that, on March 11, 1977, Văn Giang and Yên Mỹ districts were unified into Văn Yên district; Tiên Lữ and Phù Cừ districts were unified into Phù Tiên district; Văn Lâm and Mỹ Hào districts were unified into Văn Mỹ.

On February 24, 1979, Kim Động and Ân Thi districts were unified into Kim Thi district. Văn Yên and Văn Mỹ districts were unified into Mỹ Văn; Khoái Châu district and a part of Văn Giang district were unified into Châu Giang district.

On November 6, 1996, the National Assembly approved the division of Hải Hưng into Hải Dương and Hưng Yên. After that, the unified districts were split as the former administrative units.

Hưng Yên now has ten district and town-level administrative units: Hưng Yên city and the districts of Văn Lâm, Văn Giang, Mỹ Hào, Yên Mỹ, Khoái Châu, Ân Thi, Kim Động, Tiên Lữ and Phù Cừ, with a total 161 communes, districts and towns.

Geography

Location, topography 

Hưng Yên is located in the northern region of Vietnam, situated in the Vietnam's Red River delta. The terrain is relatively flat, consisting of low hills interspersed with plain. 

The eastern gateway to Hanoi, Hưng Yên, has 23 km of the 5A National Highway and over 20 km of the Hanoi-Haiphong railway route. In addition, the national highways 39A and 38, which are prolonged from the National Highway 5, passes by Hưng Yên city, running to the National Highway 1A through Yên Lệnh Bridge and to the National Highway 10 through Triều Dương Bridge. This is an important transportation axis linking southwestern provinces in the Northern Delta (Hà Nam, Ninh Bình, Nam Định and Thanh Hóa) with Hải Dương, Haiphong and Quảng Ninh provinces.

Hưng Yên is close to Haiphong and Cái Lân seaports and Noi Bai International Airport. It has borders with Hanoi and the provinces of Bắc Ninh, Hà Tây, Hà Nam, Thái Bình and Hải Dương.

Climate 

Like other provinces in the Red River Delta, Hưng Yên is affected by the hot and damp tropical monsoon climate. Every year, there are two separate hot and cold seasons in the province. The sun shines on average 1,519 hours per year and the average number of sunny days per month is 24. The average temperature is 23.2 °C in the summer and 16 °C in the winter.

The average humidity in the air is 86%; the highest level of humidity is 92% while the lowest level is 79%.

Natural resources
Hưng Yên has the features of a delta province: flat topography without hills and mountains. There are 61,037 hectares of agricultural land, of which 55,645 hectares (91%) are for yearly cultivation and the remainder are for cultivation of perennial plants, fish farming, specialized cultivation and other purposes. The area of unused natural land is about 7,471 hectares, which are all available for agricultural production and development.

Hưng Yên has a plentiful fresh water source because it is surrounded by the Hồng River and Luộc River. Its underground water source is also bountiful with a huge reserve. In the area along the 5A National Highway, from Như Quỳnh to Quán Gỏi, there lie mammoth underground water mines with a reserve of millions of cubic metres, which not only can supply water for industrial development and urban daily consumption but also can supply a big water volume for neighbouring localities.

Hưng Yên's lignite source, which is a part of the brown basin in the Red River Delta and has a 30-billion-tonne reserve, has not been exploited yet. However, there is big potential to develop the mining industry, meeting the energy demand in the domestic market and exports.

Administrative divisions
Hưng Yên is subdivided into 10 district-level sub-divisions, which are further subdivided into 161 commune-level sub-divisions.

Workforce
The natural population growth rate is 1% per year. Hưng Yên has 57,000 young and highly educated people of working age, representing 51% of the provincial population. The number of workers having attended training courses accounts for 25% of the population, mainly graduates from universities, colleges and high schools; and technical workers.

References

 
Provinces of Vietnam